Woodbridge railway station is on the East Suffolk Line in the east of England, serving the town of Woodbridge, Suffolk. Its three-letter station code is WDB.

The station was opened in 1859. Today it is managed by Abellio Greater Anglia, which also operates all trains that call.

History
The line opened on 1 June 1859, and Woodbridge station opened with the line. The ESR was absorbed by the ECR on opening day.

On 1 July 1862, the ECR and other small railway companies amalgamated to become the Great Eastern Railway (GER). At the 1923 Grouping, the GER was amalgamated with other companies to form the London and North Eastern Railway; this in turn was a constituent of British Railways at the start of 1948.

On 1 January 1927 there was a train crash at Woodbridge station. A wagon coupling had broken at Bealings and when the engine stopped at Woodbridge, the rear portion running downhill smashed into the back of the stationary train. Only one minor injury was recorded.

The station's goods yard closed on 18 April 1966. The ticket office closed with the introduction of Paytrains on 7 March 1967.

With the privatisation of British Rail, ownership of the line and station passed to Railtrack on 1 April 1994. The franchise to operate the passenger services on this route was won by Anglia Railways in 1997; in 2004 National Express won the franchise and operated services using the branding 'one', which was renamed National Express East Anglia in 2008. In 2012, the franchise passed to the current operator, Abellio Greater Anglia.

On 28 January 2003 a train collided with a car on the ungated level crossing leading to the marina.

On 13 December 2010 a train hit a car on a level crossing close to Woodbridge station.

In spring 2021 due to increasing number of people using the crossings, the barriers at Haywards and Ferry Lane level crossings were upgraded to full barriers making them safer.

Services
, the typical Monday-Sunday off-peak service at Woodbridge is as follows:

Direct trains to and from London Liverpool Street were withdrawn in 2010.

Notes

External links

Railway stations in Suffolk
DfT Category F1 stations
Former Great Eastern Railway stations
Railway stations in Great Britain opened in 1859
Greater Anglia franchise railway stations
Woodbridge, Suffolk